Tanah Merah MRT station is an elevated Mass Rapid Transit (MRT) interchange station on the East West line located in Bedok, Singapore. Other than the main service for the East West line, Tanah Merah station is also the terminus for the Changi Airport branch line, a spur of the East West line.

Tanah Merah station is located at the boundaries of Bedok North and Bedok South planning subzones, and is built along New Upper Changi Road between the junctions of Bedok South Avenue 3/Tanah Merah Kechil Road and Tanah Merah Kechil Avenue.

Tanah Merah station is one of the only two elevated MRT stations to have more tracks than the conventional two train tracks on other stations (the other one being Ang Mo Kio). The middle track serves the train service of the Changi Airport Branch line, which terminates at Changi Airport.

Tanah Merah means 'red earth' in Malay, which is derived from the red lateritic cliffs along the coast that were once visible from the sea (most of which were leveled into the sea for land reclamation works).

Since 2017, Tanah Merah station is officially assigned the station code "CG", in addition to the station code "EW4" which the station originally had, to differentiate the operations of the main service and the Changi Airport branch line, albeit that it was not displayed on the signage of the station until 2021.

Announced on 25 May 2019, the station will be transferred over to the Thomson–East Coast line by 2040, and the Changi branch of the East West line will cease to operate.

History

On 14 January 1986, the contract for building the Bedok MRT station, including the underpass and viaduct from Kembangan to Tanah Merah was awarded to RDC-Obayashi Joint Venture under Contracts 304 and 305. In addition, the contract for building the Tanah Merah MRT station and the line to Changi Depot was also awarded to Hyundai Engineering.

The station was originally not going to be open with the rest of the East West Line in between 1988 and 1989 as there were only private houses surrounding it, but increasing pressure from Members of Parliament and the public forced SMRT to open this station. When it opened, the demand was extremely stagnant, with only private houses, Bedok South housing estates and Fengshan housing estates to cater to. The demand increased when Singapore Expo and the MRT line to Changi Airport opened.

As with most of the above-ground stations built in the past along the East West line, it was built without platform screen doors. Due to the 2010 accident, installation of the half-height screen doors at this station commenced on 10 January 2011 and operations commenced on 30 March that year. It is also the final MRT station to have the HVLS fans installed, which went operational on 5 January 2013.

The addition of a new platform was announced by Land Transport Authority on 25 August 2014 to allow trains to arrive and depart at shorter intervals and an improvement in waiting times with the enhancements. On 26 October 2016, the Land Transport Authority awarded the civil contract to Lum Chang Building Contractors Pte. Ltd. to build a new platform at Tanah Merah station and viaducts for a contract sum of S$325 million. In addition to the new platforms, the existing East West line tracks will be extended to connect the line to the new four-in-one East Coast Integrated Depot at Changi, as well as the new underpass to be constructed, which will be Exit C to Tanah Merah Kechil Avenue and Exit D to The Glades Condominium. In order to facilitate construction, the road at New Upper Changi Road will have to be realigned and the Katong Flower Shop was closed down. When completed in 2024, it will be the second station to have triple island platforms after Jurong East.

On 25 May 2019, the Land Transport Authority announced an extension of the Thomson–East Coast line (TEL) to Changi Airport. Set to be completed by 2040, the TEL will be extended from its terminus at Sungei Bedok MRT station to serve the future Changi Airport Terminal 5, and the stretch between Tanah Merah and Changi Airport, which is currently part of the east–west line, will be transferred over to the Thomson–East Coast line. As part of the transfer, the viaducts linking Tanah Merah and Simei are set to be decommissioned in 2026, with proposals for the viaduct to be converted into a green corridor under study.

References

External links
 
 Changi Airport to Tanah Merah MRT station route

Railway stations in Singapore opened in 1989
Bedok
Mass Rapid Transit (Singapore) stations